Wallisville is an unincorporated town in northern Chambers County, Texas, United States, just east of the Trinity River along Interstate 10 and north of Lake Anahuac.

History
A military settlement, known as "El Orcoquisac", consisting of the Spanish fort, Presidio San Augustín de Ahumada and its complementing partner, Mission Nuestra Señora de la Luz, was established in 1756, on the east bank of the Trinity River near present-day Wallisville, upon the former site of an early French trading post.

This town was the county seat for Chambers County from 1858 to 1908 when the county seat was moved to Anahuac. The town was named after Elisha Henry Roberts Wallis, one of the original settlers of the site. The Wallis’ home would be used to house the captured Mexican dictator Antonio López de Santa Anna in 1836 as he was being transported as a prisoner to Washington, D.C. In 1857, a post office would be established there and within the following year, Wallisville was chosen over Anahuac for the new county seat. The town served as a steamboat landing for the Trinity River servicing the lumber and shipbuilding trades, the two businesses that would fuel the local economy. The region suffered widespread damage during the 1875 hurricane and was almost completely destroyed in the 1915 hurricane. In 1906, businessmen in Anahuac pushed to have an election to move the county seat there. The Chambers County voters approved this the following year, and in 1908 the county records were moved to Anahuac.

After Hurricane Ike the United States Postal Service temporarily relocated Wallisville post office box services to Mont Belvieu, Texas.

Wallisville Heritage Park
In 1979 a private, nonprofit organization named  the Wallisville Heritage Park was organized by concerned residents interested in saving the original Wallisville townsite.
This organization operates for the preservation, restoration, and study of the Wallisville Townsite and the El Orcoquisac Archeological District, two sites that are listed in the National Register of Historic Places.

Education
The area is in Anahuac Independent School District.

Climate
The climate in this area is characterized by hot, humid summers and generally mild to cool winters.  According to the Köppen Climate Classification system, Wallisville has a humid subtropical climate, abbreviated "Cfa" on climate maps.

References

External links

 

Unincorporated communities in Chambers County, Texas
Unincorporated communities in Texas
Greater Houston